Mary Lee Tracy is an American gymnastics coach and owner of Cincinnati Gymnastics Academy, an elite program in Fairfield, Ohio.

Personal life 
Tracy was born in Cincinnati, and has lived in Ohio all her life. Tracy attended Colerain High School and was a 1977 graduate. After graduating high school, Tracy joined the Cincinnati Ben-Gals cheerleading squad for NFL team Cincinnati Bengals.

Coaching career 
Tracy started the Cincinnati Gymnastics Academy in 1988 and has created over 25 national team members and 4 Olympians.

In the past, she has coached Amanda Borden, Jaycie Phelps, Kim Zmeskal, Alyssa Beckerman, Dominique Moceanu, Ashley Priess and more recently, Kayla Williams, Amelia Hundley, Lexie Priessman, Amanda Jetter, Brianna Brown and Emily Gaskins.

Cincinnati Gymnastics Academy currently has two elite gymnasts; Emily Gaskins and Lilly Lippeatt.

In 2014, Lexie Priessman, the program's former top elite gymnast, decided to leave the gym, expressing that she needed a "change". Previously, in 2013, an incident occurred with former CGA elite gymnast Alexis Beucler when Tracy created a petition to force her to drop to Level 10, causing Beucler to later move to Florida to train with Brandy Johnson. Despite her reputation, she is regarded as one of the best gymnastics coaches in the United States.

Tracy is also a USA Gymnastics coaches representative for the Women's International Elite committee and attends the committee meetings.

References 

American gymnastics coaches
Sportspeople from Cincinnati
Living people
Cincinnati Gymnastics Academy
American cheerleaders
National Football League cheerleaders
Year of birth missing (living people)